Robert L. Barnes  is a retired judge who served on the Federal Court of Canada from November 2005 until November 2021.

Personal life
Barnes was born in New Westminster, British Columbia in 1951.

Education
He received degrees from Acadia University and Dalhousie University in Nova Scotia.

Career
In 1978, Barnes was called to the bar in British Columbia and Nova Scotia, and was appointed as Queens Counsel in 1995.  Barnes became a Judge of the Federal Court in 2005, and Judge of the Court Martial Appeal Court of Canada in 2006, and a judicial member of the Competition Tribunal in 2015.

Red Cross
Barnes was the vice-president of the International Federation of Red Cross and Red Crescent Societies from 2004 to 2005 and was president of the Canadian Red Cross Society from 2001 to 2004.

References

Living people
Judges of the Federal Court of Canada
Schulich School of Law alumni
Year of birth missing (living people)